Mohammad Aslam Khan Bareach (born 26 January 1976) is a Pakistani cricket umpire. He has stood as an umpire in 24 first-class, 13 List A one-day and eight Twenty20 matches between 2014–2019.

References

External links
 

1976 births
Living people
People from Quetta
Pakistani cricket umpires